Israel Joshua Singer (Yiddish: ישראל יהושע זינגער ; November 30, 1893, Biłgoraj, Congress Poland — February 10, 1944 New York) was a Polish-Jewish novelist who wrote in Yiddish.

Biography
He was born Yisruel Yehoyshye Zinger, the son of Pinchas Mendl Zynger, a rabbi and author of rabbinic commentaries, and Basheva Zylberman. He was the brother of the author Isaac Bashevis Singer and novelist Esther Kreitman. He married Genia Kupferstok. His eldest son, Yasha, died at 14 of pneumonia  before the family's emigration to America. His younger son, Joseph Singer, was the translator for both his father's works and his uncle's, Isaac Bashevis Singer. Joseph, a painter and writer like his father, married June Flaum Singer, who went on to become a writer. They had four children: Sharon Salinger, Brett Singer, I.J. Singer and Valerie Singer. The three daughters followed in the family business and are also published poets and novelists.

Singer contributed to the European Yiddish press from 1916. In 1919, he and his wife Genia went to Ukraine, where he found work on a newspaper, The New Times, and was considered one of the "Kiev Writers". Then they moved to Moscow, where he published articles and stories. After two hard years, in 1921, they returned to Warsaw. In 1921, after Abraham Cahan noticed his story Pearls, Singer became a correspondent for the American Yiddish newspaper The Forward. His short story Liuk appeared in 1924, illuminating the ideological confusion of the Bolshevik Revolution. He wrote his first novel, Steel and Iron, in 1927. In 1934 he emigrated to the United States to write for The Forward.
Eventually, Israel Joshua invited his younger brother, the future Nobel prize winner Isaac Bashevis Singer, to the United States and engineered for him a job with The Forward. 
"Had it not been for Joshua, Abraham Cahan would have fired him", Singer's wife Genia later confessed to Bashevis' son Israel Zamir.
He died of a heart attack at age 50 in New York City, 258 Riverside Drive on February 10, 1944.

Works
His memoir Fun a velt vos iz nishto mer (English: Of a World That is No More) was published posthumously in 1946. His other works include:
 Shtol un Ayzn (1927); translated into English as Blood Harvest (1935) and as Steel and Iron (1969)
 Nay Rusland (Eng: New Russia) (1928)
 Yoshe Kalb (1932). Also translated as The Sinner, Liveright Pub., NY (1933) 
 The Brothers Ashkenazi (1936)
 Friling (1937)
  East of Eden (originally titled Khaver Nachman) published by Alfred J. Knopf (1939)
 The Family Carnovsky (1969) (originally titled Di mishpokhe Karnovski) (1943)
 The River Breaks Up, stories published by Alfred Knopf (1938); republished by Vanguard Press, NY (1966)
 Dertseylungen  (English: Stories); published posthumously, 1949

In the introduction to A Treasury of Yiddish Stories, Irving Howe and Eliezer Greenberg stated that Singer's books are organized "in a way that satisfies the usual Western expectations as to literary structure. His novels resemble the kind of family chronicle popular in Europe several decades ago [that is, the turn of the century]".

References

Sources

External links
Obituary @ JTA
Free version in Yiddish of Fun A Welt Wos Iz Nishto Mer

1893 births
1944 deaths
American people of Polish-Jewish descent
Jewish American writers
Yiddish-language playwrights
Yiddish-language journalists
American male novelists
Male dramatists and playwrights
20th-century American novelists
20th-century dramatists and playwrights
20th-century American male writers
20th-century American Jews
American Ashkenazi Jews
Polish emigrants to the United States